Speechless is an American television sitcom that aired on ABC from September 21, 2016, to April 12, 2019. Created by Scott Silveri and co-executive produced with Christine Gernon, Jake Kasdan, and Melvin Mar, the 20th Television/ABC Signature co-production was greenlighted to series order on May 13, 2016. A first-look trailer was released on the same day. Starring Minnie Driver, John Ross Bowie and Micah Fowler, the sitcom explores the serious and humorous challenges a family faces with a teenager with a disability. On September 29, 2016, the series was picked up for a full 22-episode season. An additional episode was ordered on December 13, 2016, for a 23-episode season. On May 10, 2019, ABC cancelled the series after three seasons.

Plot

The series follows the DiMeo family, each with a unique personality: Maya, a take-charge British mother with a no-holds-barred attitude; her husband Jimmy, who does not seem to care what others think; Dylan, their no-nonsense athletic daughter; Ray, their scholarly middle child who acts as the "voice of reason" in the family; and their oldest son, JJ — a high schooler who has a biting wit and sense of humor, and is diagnosed with cerebral palsy. JJ communicates by using headgear with a laser pointer to indicate various words, letters, and numbers on a board attached to his wheelchair. One of the reasons the DiMeos move frequently, is due to an attempt to find a good educational environment for JJ. They believe they have found an optimal choice when they discover a school that prides itself on being inclusive and where JJ will have an aide support him throughout the school day. Because the school is in an upscale part of town, Jimmy and Maya move the family into the cheapest, most rundown house in an otherwise nice neighborhood. Though they quickly find that not everything is as good as it could be. JJ enjoys having Kenneth, a gentle, well-meaning school groundskeeper with a deep and resonant speaking voice, work as his aide.

Cast and characters

Main
 Minnie Driver as Maya DiMeo, the fierce and determined mother of the family
 John Ross Bowie as Jimmy DiMeo, the fun-loving, easily persuadable father of the family who is a supervisor of baggage handlers at the airport
 Mason Cook as Raymond "Ray" DiMeo, the middle child. Slender and nerdy, he faces constant harassment, mostly from Dylan.
 Micah Fowler as Jimmy "JJ" DiMeo Jr., The eldest child with cerebral palsy. He is non-speaking (thus the show's title) and uses a wheelchair. He has a crush on Emma Watson, which serves as a running gag on the show.
 Kyla Kenedy as Dylan DiMeo, the athletic youngest child, and only daughter. She enjoys pulling pranks and harassing others, especially Ray.
 Cedric Yarbrough as Kenneth Clements, the good-natured aide to JJ who serves as his voice. Although he and Maya tend to butt heads, she is appreciative of his work.

Recurring
 Pepper, the happy Golden Retriever who's supposed to be Dylan's pet, but acts like he's more fond of the others
 Marin Hinkle as Dr. Ava Miller, the principal of the kids' school who is easily influenced by Maya
 Jonathan Slavin as Mr. Powers, one of JJ's teachers
 Liz Cackowski as Joyce, JJ's physiotherapist
 Sarah Chalke as Melanie Hertzal, Taylor's mother
 Kayla Maisonet as Izzy, JJ's girlfriend
 Jack Dylan Grazer as Rev
 David Lengel as Tad
 Sedona Cohen as Taylor, Ray's ex-girlfriend
 Cole Massie as Logan, Melanie's son, Taylor's brother, and JJ's nemesis
 Karly Rothenberg as Crossing Guard

Special guests
 Rob Corddry as Billy, Jimmy's brother
 Andrea Anders as Audrey, Billy's wife
 Julianne Hough as Miss Bloom, the new choir teacher at the kids' school
 Jamie Denbo as Janet, the DiMeos' insurance agent
 Jim O'Heir as Stu, the DiMeos' former insurance agent
 Ken Marino as Ethan, Maya's ex-boyfriend
 Michaela Watkins as Becca, a new mom at the group of families with disabled kids
 Zach Anner as Lee, a wheelchair-using young man who Maya asks to speak with JJ about living on his own
 Holland Taylor as Andrea, Maya's pretentious mother
 Keith David as Colonel Clements, Kenneth's father
 John Cleese as Martin, Maya's father who lives in London
 Julie White as Helen, Lee's over protective mother
 Niecy Nash as Kiki, Kenneth's sister
 Lisa Leslie as Kendall, Kenneth's sister
 Tricia O'Kelley as Candy Kensington
 Rondi Reed as Nina
 Christopher Thornton as Chris
 Bella Thorne as Cassidy
 Jay Chandrasekhar as Coach

Episodes

Production

Development
On January 11, 2016, it was announced that ABC had given the production a pilot order as Speechless. The episode was written by Scott Silveri who was expected to executive produce alongside Christine Gernon, Jake Kasdan and Melvin Mar. Production companies involved with the pilot include Silver and Gold Productions, The Detective Agency, ABC Studios and 20th Century Fox Television. On May 13, 2016, ABC officially ordered the pilot to series. A few days later, it was announced that the series would premiere in the fall of 2016 and air on Tuesdays at 9:30 P.M. EST. On September 23, 2016, ABC picked up the series for a full season of 22 episodes and on December 13, they get only one episode. On May 12, 2017, ABC renewed the series for a second season which premiered on September 27, 2017. On May 11, 2018, ABC renewed the series for a third season and announced it would air on Fridays at 8:30 P.M. EST and premiered on October 5, 2018.

Casting
On February 24, 2016, it was announced that Cedric Yarbrough had been cast in the pilot. In March 2016, it was reported that Minnie Driver and John Ross Bowie had also joined the pilot's main cast.

Cancellation 
Speechless aired on the network ABC for about three years before the ultimate decision to cancel it. The final decision to cancel the show was made due to the fact that it was the lowest-rated series on the network. Variety explains that the last, and concluding season, ranked the lowest within the network with only around 2.3 million live viewers. Deadline notes that former ABC president, Karey Burke explained that the cancellation of the show Speechless was "gut wrenching" decision. Ultimately, the choice was made due to the low number of viewers, as well as the introduction of a new show, Fresh Off The Boat.

One of the main actors, Minnie Driver, notes that while it is saddening that the show has been canceled, the main hope is that the show left a lasting impact on its audience. Minnie Driver, who plays JJ's mom, continued to explain she believes that conversations regarding disability, love, as well as family have been left in better terms than they were found. Another main actor, Micah Fowler, who portrays JJ on the show, took to Twitter to express his gratitude towards the fans, and staff, for the amazing life changing opportunity. While the show was only on air for three years, it left a lasting impression on its audience.

Reception

Critical response
Speechless received largely positive reviews from critics. On Rotten Tomatoes, the series has a rating of 98%, based on 41 reviews, with an average rating of 8.2/10. The site's critical consensus reads, "Speechless speaks to a sensitive topic with a heartfelt lead performance and a fine balance of sensitivity and irreverence." On Metacritic, the series has a score of 79 out of 100, based on 29 critics, indicating "generally favorable reviews".

The editors of TV Guide placed Speechless seventh among the top ten picks for the most anticipated new shows of the 2016–17 season. In its review from writer Liam Matthews, "ABC has another worthwhile addition to its strong lineup of modern families with Speechless," adding "It's a clear-eyed and empathetic exploration of life in a special-needs family that makes plenty of room for hilarity."

Representation 
Speechless is one of the few shows that portrays the life of a teenager with a disability. It is also one of the few shows that has a disabled actor play the character. According to Bond, there are approximately 21 million children, between the ages of 5 and 15, that have a disability. If television, and the media, were able to mirror the demographics of the U.S. then about 14% of characters would be disabled. Speechless was just one example, however it was cancelled after a couple of seasons due to 'low ratings' despite a good audience reception. Bond notes that media representation of disability, both mental and physical, may impact audiences in a more profound manner than telling them what disability is like. Through the introduction of physical disabilities, there is hope to integrate individuals into society, without prejudice and biases. Bond continues to explain that children begin to distinguish and detect differences as young as 4 years of age. Marquis notes that representations in movies like Still Alice and The Theory of Everything are two popular examples that perpetuate inconsistencies about the disabled body. These authors explain that there is disability representation in the media, however it is lacking authenticity and adequate portrayal. Shows like Speechless should be given a platform, for the actors and production team, to speak on the issues surrounding representation.

Ratings

Accolades

Home media

References

External links
 
 
 

2010s American single-camera sitcoms
2016 American television series debuts
2019 American television series endings
American Broadcasting Company original programming
Television shows about child care occupations
English-language television shows
Television series about families
Television series about siblings
Television series by 20th Century Fox Television
Television series by ABC Studios
Television shows set in California
Works about cerebral palsy and other paralytic syndromes
Television Academy Honors winners